Zoltan Kondorossy (born 28 January 1906, date of death unknown) was a Romanian wrestler. He competed in the men's Greco-Roman heavyweight at the 1936 Summer Olympics.

References

External links
 

1906 births
Year of death missing
Romanian male sport wrestlers
Olympic wrestlers of Romania
Wrestlers at the 1936 Summer Olympics
Sportspeople from Arad, Romania